Thelairodrino is a genus of flies in the family Tachinidae.

Species
T. gracilis (Mesnil, 1952)

References

Exoristinae
Diptera of Europe
Diptera of Asia
Tachinidae genera
Taxa named by Friedrich Moritz Brauer
Taxa named by Julius von Bergenstamm